Cisco DevNet  is Cisco's developer program to help developers and IT professionals who want to write applications and develop integrations with Cisco products, platforms, and APIs. Cisco DevNet includes Cisco's products in software-defined networking, security, cloud, data center, internet of things, collaboration, and open-source software development. The developer.cisco.com site also provides learning and sandbox environments as well as a video series for those trying to learn coding and testing apps.

History 

Cisco has a long history of building a developer community. Cisco began its developer initiatives in 2000 with the Architecture for Voice, Video and Integrated Devices (AVVID). At this time, most developers were focused on creating customizations for the Cisco VoIP phone systems.

At some point, the developer focus of the AVVID program grew, and Cisco launched the Cisco Technology Developer Program (CTDP). This evolved into the Cisco Developer Community (CDC) and Cisco Developer Network (CDN) in 2009. This growth extended the number of APIs used to build solutions on Cisco platforms, and included API guides, forums, downloads, and the early version of the sandbox system.

As Cisco's need to support developers grew, DevNet was launched in 2014 under leadership of Susie Wee. The new Cisco developer network contains APIs from many of Cisco's technologies, including networking, IoT, collaboration, open source, data center, and others. It also contains learning labs, a sandbox, and a community where developers can share their creations. DevNet also attends and hosts many developer events, such as hackathons and coding camps 

DevNet holds developer events around the world, including the DevNet Zone at Cisco Live.

DevNet held its first DevNet Create developer conference aimed at an application developer and DevOps audience in San Francisco in May 2017. Guy Kawasaki spoke about "The Art of Innovation" during DevNet Create 2018. DevNet Create 2019 returns to the Computer History Museum in Mountain View, California April 24–25, 2019.

Site Components 

DevNet has several components that help developers learn how to code and work with Cisco APIs.

API Guides and Documentation 

Cisco DevNet supports a wide variety of technologies. For each product, individual API guides and documentation are provided. Several API types are supported, depending on the product. For example, many of the newer technologies have REST APIs, while some of the older collaboration-based products might support XML coding.

Learning Labs 

DevNet's Learning Labs provide individual labs, learning modules, and learning tracks for coders of all skill levels. Developers and students can learn coding basics. Network engineers can get more familiar with Software Defined Networking (SDN) and other networking-specific areas. Experienced coders can get more in-depth training on Cisco APIs.

Sandboxes 

Sandboxes on DevNet provide a free space where people can try out their code in a network environment. Depending on the product, some sandboxes are virtual while others utilize lab equipment.

Sample Code 

DevNet sample code exists can be uploaded from a GitHub repository to the DevNet Code Exchange. This tool allows developers to find, download, and contribute to code. You can also find DevNet sample code from the CiscoDevNet GitHub organization on ciscodevnet.github.io.

DevNet Exchange 

The DevNet Exchange displays a variety of solutions, applications, and code that has been developed with Cisco products in mind by Cisco Partners. The site allows developers to explore code by other developers as well as provides a platform to showcase code.

Awards 

Best Overall Developer Portal Award, Community Spotlight & Outreach Award, and Best DX Innovation Award.  2018 DevPortal Awards

Collaboration with Apple 

In June 2016, Cisco and Apple Inc. announced a partnership at the Apple Worldwide Developers Conference. This partnership was intended to build greater interoperability between Cisco gear and Apple iOS. Some of Cisco's supported APIs include:
 Connected Mobile Experience (CMX) 
 Cisco Spark 
 Tropo 
 Cisco Instant Connect

Getting DevNet Certified 
You can choose to Do It Yourself or DIY, or you can follow a structured approach where a training provider has broken the official curriculum down into lessons, labs and practice quizzes. Regardless of the approach taken, DevNet skill set can be broken down into five domains of knowledge.

 Network Fundamentals (protocols, devices, connectivity options up/down the TCP/IP stack including knowledge of Linux)
 Programming Skills (primarily Python)
 DevOps Tools (CICD, SCM's such as Git etc.)
 Infrastructure APIs (obviously, every vendor has their own so DevNet program focuses on Cisco)
 Application development (or Integrations) and Deployment lifecycle

See also
Apple Developer
Microsoft Developer Network
IBM DeveloperWorks

References

External links 
 Cisco DevNet
Cisco DevNet Learning Labs
Code Exchange

Cisco Systems
Software developer communities